Rafael Brieva Primo (born 18 September 1983 in Seville, Andalusia), known as Fali, is a Spanish former footballer who played as a centre forward.

External links

Villarrobledo official profile 

1983 births
Living people
Footballers from Seville
Spanish footballers
Association football forwards
Segunda División players
Segunda División B players
Tercera División players
Sevilla FC C players
Sevilla Atlético players
SD Eibar footballers
Ontinyent CF players
Orihuela CF players